Robert Latham Brown (born June 20, 1947) is a film producer, line producer, production manager, author, and teacher. In his 30-year film career, he has worked with Mel Brooks, George Lucas, Paul Verhoeven, Steven Spielberg and many others. His expertise in budgeting and line producing inspired Mel Brooks to nickname Brown "Mr. On-Budget".

Biographical Information and Education
Brown was born in Alexandria, Virginia, and moved to Florida with his family during his junior high school years. He attended Tulane University in New Orleans where he studied biology and was a pre-med student. At the beginning of his senior year, Brown switched his major to acting and directing in the theater. Upon receiving his Bachelor of Arts degree in 1969, Brown taught in the Brevard County public school system in Florida for three years. In 1972, he applied to the UCLA School of Theater, Film and Television as a master's degree candidate. When he was not accepted, Brown drove across the country and made an appointment with the Dean of the Film School. Upon learning that Brown had driven all that way to see him, the Dean promptly admitted Brown to the program based on his perseverance. Brown became the graduate teaching assistant in the beginning camera class, and counted amongst his students actor and singer Ed Ames.

While at UCLA, Brown considered a career as a screenwriter and was accepted as a client at the William Morris Agency. In 1974, Brown put aside his writing career and left UCLA when he was accepted into the Directors Guild of America's Assistant Directors Training Program. Once in the DGA, Brown rose rapidly through the ranks becoming one of the youngest production managers at Universal Studios in 1978.

Career
As producer and production manager, Brown has worked on more than 40 feature films, including the very small (Local Color, The Anarchist Cookbook)  and the very large (Return of the Jedi, Starship Troopers, and Hollow Man), giving him a wide range of production experience.

Brown spent most of his early career at Universal Studios until The Thing, after which he left for Lucasfilm to work on Return of the Jedi at the invitation of Howard Kazanjian. From that point on, Brown's career has taken on a freelance aspect that has allowed him to work on an eclectic list of films and with some of the top actors in the business including Michael Douglas, Harrison Ford, Samuel L. Jackson, and Kevin Bacon. During the filming of a scene with Barbra Streisand on All Night Long in which Streisand was playing a character who could not sing, Brown remembered, "...when we started to film that scene, she opened her mouth and this incredible voice came out. And everybody on the set just stood there with their mouths open listening to this. Then she stopped because she was supposed to be singing badly....It was astounding being in the room with her."<ref>Spada, James, Streisand: Her Life (New York: Crown Publishers Inc., 1995), 396-397.</ref>

Author and teacher
Brown is also the author of the critically acclaimed book, Planning the Low-Budget Film, and has been an adjunct professor at the USC School of Cinematic Arts since 1996. Additionally, Brown is a contributing writer to Indie Slate Magazine, writing a series of reviews on film production software.

Writing Awards
Brown's book, Planning the Low-Budget Film was a finalist for the 2007 Benjamin Franklin Awards, and that same year was a first-place winner in the Hollywood Book Festival.
In 2002, his screenplay Keats was named a semi-finalist in the 9th Annual Writer's Network Screenplay and Fiction Competition. In 2020, his screenplay Xena & Jonny'' was named a finalist in the ScreenCraft Family Screenplay Competition.

Partial filmography

References

External links
 

Living people
Businesspeople from Alexandria, Virginia
American film producers
Tulane University alumni
UCLA Film School alumni
University of Southern California faculty
1947 births